Koleje Śląskie (Polish for Silesian Railways; KŚ) is a regional rail operator in the Silesian Voivodeship of Poland.
The company was founded in 2010 and is fully owned by the local government. It started servicing in October 2011.

Lines

Rolling stock

Gallery

External links 
 
 

Silesian Voivodeship
Railway companies of Poland
Railway companies established in 2010
Companies based in Katowice
Polish Limited Liability Companies